Lyle Mays is the first solo album by Pat Metheny Group keyboardist Lyle Mays, self-titled, and released in 1986. The album was recorded at The Power Station in New York in 1985. The album has had re-releases in 1993, 1998, and in digital format in 2010.

Reception

The AllMusic review by Richard S. Ginell awards the album 4.5 stars and states:
Lyle Mays waited a long, long time before straying from the Pat Metheny Group to issue his first solo album, but when he did, the results were at once removed but not totally untethered to the Metheny sound and feeling. On his own, Mays' synthesizer solos and textures are close in sound to what he was doing in the Metheny group, but the turns of phrases in his acoustic piano solos reflect the heavy shadow of Keith Jarrett... Although the 14-minute "Alaskan Suite" forms the centerpiece of the LP's side two, the entire side could be considered a suite as a whole, with a ruminative piano solo "Mirror of the Heart" preceding "Alaskan Suite," and "Close to Home" reprising the twinkling, burbling shafts of synthesizer of "Alaskan Suite"'s opening.

Track listing

Personnel
Lyle Mays – piano, synthesizer, autoharp
Alejandro N. Acuña – drums
Billy Drewes – alto & soprano saxophones
Bill Frisell – guitar
Marc Johnson – acoustic bass
Nana Vasconcelos – percussion
Ted Jensen at Sterling Sound, NYC – mastering

Charts

References

1986 debut albums
Geffen Records albums